Apoorva Raagangal is a 2015 Indian Tamil-language soap opera that airs on Sun TV. The show premiered on 10 August 2015 to 7 July 2018 for 859 episodes. The show stars Shruthi Raj and Mithun. The show was directed by Justin Jeyaraj and produced by The Purple Productions

Cast

Main cast
 Shruthi Raj as Pavithira 
Mithun as Dev / Stephen Raj (Stephen Raj was killed by Swetha)

Recurring cast
Swetha as Swetha Stephen Raj  
Akhila as Madhavi 
Sai Madhavi as Revathi
Chandhini Prakash as Gayathri
J.Lalitha as Balamani Dev's mother
Balambika/ Bhagya as Mariamma 
C.V.Ravishankaran as Muthupandian and Sankarapandian (Dual role)
Nithya Ravindran as Padmini's Mom
Lenin Anpan
 Balaji as Pandiyan IPS
 T.V.V.Ramanujam as Pavithra's father
 Mounicka Devi\ Hanshika as Subhulakshmi aka Subha
 Shanthi Anandraj as Shanthi
 Yamuna as Indhira
 Sanjay as Arivu
Kalyan as Prabhu
 Vijay Anand as Deena
 Egavalli as Padmini
 Shanthi Anandraj as Pandiyan's mother
 S.V.S Kumar as Mariamma's father
 Jai Ganesh as Ram
 Sundari
 Baby Monika Devi as Malini
 Baby Soukiya as Nisha
 Vairam as Ammavasai 
 Guru as Kishore
 VJ Saravanan kumar as Villan
 Kalyani
 Sharmila
 A. Pandy
 Pandidurai
 Raman as Hari
 Denappan
 Keerthi Shrathah as Kavitha
 Kirushnakanth as Krishna
 Meena as Caroline  
 Kalyan as Kathir
 Ahalya
 Kathir
 Premnath
 Vijayakumari
 Vasantha as Aswini
 Naveen as Navin
 Parvathi

Original soundtrack

Title song
It was written by Dr. Krithaya, composed by Prashathini Prem and background score  by Kiran. It was sung by Subramaniyam, Sai lakshmi, Aishwarya and Asvitha.

Soundtrack

Broadcast
The series was released on 10 August 2015 on Sun TV, the series also airs on Sun TV HD. The show's episodes were released on YouTube channel as The Purple Productions.
  In Sri Lanka Tamil Channel on Vasantham TV and aired Monday to Friday at 10.00 AM.

See also
 List of programs broadcast by Sun TV

References

External links
 Official Website 

Sun TV original programming
2015 Tamil-language television series debuts
Tamil-language television shows
2018 Tamil-language television series endings